SM U-153 was one of the 329 submarines serving in the Imperial German Navy in World War I. 
U-153 was engaged in the naval warfare and took part in the First Battle of the Atlantic.

U-153 was surrendered to the Allies at Harwich on 24 November 1918 in accordance with the requirements of the Armistice with Germany. 
Exhibited at Greenwich in December 1918, she was originally to be allocated to France, but was swapped with U-162 and retained by the British. Laid up at Portsmouth, she was towed into the English Channel on 30 June 1921 and scuttled.

Summary of raiding history

References

Notes

Citations

Bibliography

World War I submarines of Germany
1917 ships
Ships built in Hamburg
U-boats commissioned in 1917
U-boats scuttled in 1921
Maritime incidents in 1921
German Type U 151 submarines